This article contains a chronological summary of major events from the 2008 Summer Olympics in Beijing, China.

Calendar

August 6
Football
 The first competitions of the Games started at 5:00pm CST (UTC+8). The first events were women's football (soccer) matches. The day was devoted to women's football.

August 7
Football
 The first football (soccer) matches for men began on this day. The day was devoted to men's football matches.

August 8

 Opening Ceremony Starting at 8:00 pm CST (UTC+8), the four-hour opening ceremony was attended by 91,000 spectators, including more than 100 world leaders. The spectacle was directed by filmmaker Zhang Yimou, and the Olympic Cauldron was lit by former Chinese gymnast Li Ning. 

Equestrian
 The first events started in the Special Administrative Region of Hong Kong, with eventing in equestrian sports.

Day 1: August 9

Archery
 South Korea set an Olympic record in the ranking round of the women's team archery event.
Boxing
 Samoa's Farani Tavui was taken to a hospital after being knocked unconscious in the men's light heavyweight event.
Fencing
 The United States took all three medals in the women's sabre event, the first U.S. podium sweep of a fencing event since 1904, as Mariel Zagunis takes gold.
Judo
 Choi Min-ho of South Korea won the men's 60 kg ending all his matches with ippon.
 Ryoko Tani of Japan, who had never lost in a major international competition since 1996, was defeated in the women's 48 kg semifinals by eventual gold medalist Alina Alexandra Dumitru with a controversial penalty point.
Shooting
 Kateřina Emmons of the Czech Republic won the first gold medal of the games, setting an Olympic record for both the qualifying (with a perfect 400) and final scores, in the women's 10 m air rifle.
Swimming
 Swimmer Michael Phelps of the United States set a world record in the first round of the men's 400 m individual medley.
 Swimmer Alexander Dale Oen of Norway set an Olympic record in the first round of the men's 100 m breaststroke.
Weightlifting
 Chen Xiexia of China won the women's 48 kg event in weightlifting, setting Olympic records in both the clean and jerk, and total weight lifted.

Day 2: August 10

 Archery
South Korea set a world record for a 24-arrow team match, in their victory over Italy in the quarter finals of the women's team archery event. They went on to win the gold medal, stretching the country's winning streak to 20 years over 6 Olympic games.
 Basketball
The USA men's basketball team beat hosts China 101–70 in the first game in the basketball event.
 Shooting
Guo Wenjun of China won gold in women's 10 metre air pistol and set a new Olympic record for final score with 492.3 points, after Natalia Paderina of Russia had bettered the Olympic qualification record to 391.  During the medal ceremony, Pederina and bronze medalist Nino Salukvadze of Georgia shared a symbolic embrace as their two countries continued to wage war.
 Swimming
 Michael Phelps won the men's 400 m individual medley final, with a new world record, winning his seventh career Olympic gold medal.
 Park Tae-Hwan won the men's 400 m freestyle final, becoming the first South Korean swimmer to win an Olympic gold medal for swimming.
 Swimmer Alexander Dale Oen of Norway set an Olympic record in the semifinals of the men's 100 m breaststroke, his second in the event.
Australian swimmer Stephanie Rice set a new world record in women's 400 m individual medley, winning Australia's 400th Summer Olympics medal. Second place Kirsty Coventry of Zimbabwe also finished below the previous world record.
The Netherlands team won the women's 4 × 100 m freestyle relay final with a new Olympic record of 3 minutes 33.76 seconds. Dara Torres of the United States, at 41 years of age, becomes the oldest swimmer to win an Olympic medal after the US team takes silver.
The American men's 4 × 100 m freestyle relay team broke the world record with a time of 3:12.23 in the preliminaries.
 Weightlifting
Prapawadee Jaroenrattanatarakoon of Thailand won gold in women's 53 kg weightlifting and set a new Olympic record for clean and jerk.

Day 3: August 11

Swimming
Rebecca Adlington won the 400 m freestyle, the first gold by a British woman since 1960.
Kirsty Coventry of Zimbabwe set a new world record in the women's 100 m backstroke semifinal with a time of 58.77.
Kosuke Kitajima of Japan won the Olympic gold medal in the men's 100 m breaststroke, and set a world record of 58.91.
Arkady Vyatchanin of Russia set a new Olympic record in the men's 100 m backstroke semifinal with a time of 53.06, only for the record to be set again in the second semifinal by Hayden Stoeckel of Australia, with a time of 52.97.
The United States team broke the world record they had set in the semifinals by nearly four seconds, winning the gold medal in the men's 4 × 100 m freestyle relay with a time of 3:08:24, beating France by 0.08 seconds. Jason Lezak swam the last leg in 46.06 s, the fastest relay leg in history.  Five of the eight teams in the final finished under the previous world record. Australia's Eamon Sullivan also broke the individual 100 m freestyle world record by swimming the leadoff leg in 47.24.

 Shooting
 Entering the finals of the men's 10 m air rifle in fourth place, Abhinav Bindra won the first ever individual Olympic gold medal for India,  and India's first gold medal in any Olympic event since 1980.

 Judo
Tajikistan won its first ever Olympic medal after Rasul Boqiev secured bronze in the men's 73 kg.

Day 4: August 12

 Swimming
Michael Phelps of the U.S. set the world record while winning the 200 m men's freestyle, tying the record for most gold medals for an athlete.
Natalie Coughlin of the U.S. became the first athlete to successfully defend a gold medal in the women's 100 m backstroke event.
Shooting
Walton Eller of the U.S. set two Olympic records in the men's double trap event, with a qualifying score of 145 and a final score of 190.
 Canoeing
Benjamin Boukpeti becomes the first competitor from Togo to win an Olympic medal, taking bronze in the men's slalom K-1.

Day 5: August 13

 Wrestling
 Steeve Guenot won France's first gold medal of the Beijing Olympics in the men's 66 kg Greco-Roman wrestling.
 Swimming
Michael Phelps of the U.S. took the record for most gold medals for an athlete with 11 for wins in the 200 m butterfly and the 4 × 200 m relay.
 Gymnastics
 The Chinese women's gymnastic team won its first ever team gold medal.
 Weightlifting
 Hungary's Janos Baranyai was taken to hospital after a severe injury during the men's 77kg event in weightlifting.

Day 6: August 14

 Swimming
 Alain Bernard became the first French swimmer to win the men's 100 m freestyle, and only the third to win a gold medal in an Olympic swimming event.
 The Australian team of Stephanie Rice, Bronte Barratt, Kylie Palmer and Linda Mackenzie won the women's 4 × 200 m freestyle relay, setting a new world record time of 7 minutes 44.31 seconds and giving Rice her third gold medal at her first Olympics.
 Liu Zige won the only gold medal in a swimming event, the Women's 200 m butterfly, won by China in the games.

 Archery
 Zhang Juanjuan of China won the women's individual archery competition by beating the top three ranked archers in the event.

 Judo
Naidangiin Tüvshinbayar won Mongolia's first Olympic gold medal in the men's 100 kg.

 Wrestling
 Ara Abrahamian won a bronze medal in the 84-kilogram Greco-Roman wrestling, but during the medal ceremony stepped off of the podium and laid his medal down on the mat. Abrahamian had lost a 3-1 decision to Andrea Minguzzi in the semi-finals in a disputed decision and started shouting at referees and officials after the match. The IOC later decided to officially strip him of his medal.

Day 7: August 15

 Athletics
 Tirunesh Dibaba won the women's 10000 m in 29:54.66, the best time in almost 15 years and an African and Olympic record. Silver medallist Elvan Abeylegesse and bronze medallist Shalane Flanagan also ran European and North American records, respectively.
 Gymnastics
 Nastia Liukin of the United States won the gold medal in the Women's artistic individual all-around.  Together with Shawn Johnson taking the silver, this was the fourth time in Olympic history where a country took the top two spots in the individual all around events.
 Table tennis
 Singapore qualified for the final in the women's team event, thus ensuring that the country would win its first Olympic medal, in any event, since 1960.
 Judo
 Down a yuko and with only 16 seconds left, world champion China's Tong Wen managed to throw defending Olympic champion Japan's Maki Tsukada for the gold in women's +78 kg.
 Tennis
 Simon Aspelin and Thomas Johansson reached the men's doubles final by beating Frenchmen Arnaud Clément and Michaël Llodra in a match lasted more than four hours and ended 19-17 in the third set.

Day 8: August 16

 General
 New Zealand experienced their most successful day at an Olympics (with two gold, one silver, and two bronze medals), beating their previous best of four bronze medals in the 1988 Seoul Olympics.
 Athletics
 Russia's Valeriy Borchin won gold in the men's 20 km walk with a time of 1:19:01, edging out Jefferson Pérez, the world champion since 2003, by only 14 seconds.
Jamaica's Usain Bolt won the gold medal in the men's 100m with a world record of 9.69 seconds in a race dubbed by Michael Johnson as "the greatest 100m performance in the history of the event".
 Badminton
 Zhang Ning successfully defended her women's singles Olympic title against top seed Xie Xingfang.
 Rowing
 The British team of Tom James, Steve Williams, Pete Reed and  Andrew Triggs Hodge won the men's coxless fours, the third time in a row that Great Britain had won gold in this event.
New Zealand's Caroline and Georgina Evers-Swindell successfully defended their 2004 title in the women's double sculls by beating Germany by 0.01 seconds.
 Georgeta Andrunache of Romania won gold in the final women's coxless pair race, her fifth career gold, and her third consecutive Olympic gold in that event.
 Swimming
Michael Phelps' victory by 0.01 seconds in the men's 100 m butterfly over Serbian swimmer Milorad Čavić tied him with Mark Spitz for the most Olympic gold medals at one games.
César Cielo Filho won the men's 50 m freestyle, Brazil's first ever swimming Olympic gold medal.
 Rebecca Adlington won gold in the women's 800 m freestyle, breaking a world record that had stood since 1989.
 Tennis
 Roger Federer won his first Olympic medal by teaming up with Stanislas Wawrinka to win men's doubles for Switzerland.
 Weightlifting
 Jang Mi-Ran of South Korea won the unlimited (+75 kg) division of women's weightlifting by breaking world records five times: once in snatch, twice in clean-and-jerk, and twice in total.
 Wrestling
 Carol Huynh of Canada won the first medal of the games for Canada and became the first gold medalist in women's wrestling for Canada.

Day 9: August 17

 General
 China won its 33rd gold medal of the Beijing games by beating Singapore in the table tennis women's team event, surpassing its 32 golds of the Athens games and making this the most successful Olympiad ever for China.
 Athletics
 Jamaica took all three medals in the women's 100 m, with Shelly-Ann Fraser taking gold, and Sherone Simpson and Kerron Stewart tying for silver.
 Russia's Gulnara Galkina-Samitova broke her own world record in winning the women's 3000 m steeplechase in a time of 8 minutes 58.81 seconds.
 Cycling
 Britain's Rebecca Romero won a cycling gold to become one of the few athletes with medals in two distinct disciplines, the 2008 medal being added to her 2004 rowing silver.
 Diving
 China's Guo Jingjing became the most decorated diver in Olympic history after winning her sixth career medal in the women's 3 m springboard.
Gymnastics
Louis Smith, in winning the bronze medal in the men's pommel horse, became the first British gymnast to win an individual apparatus medal in gymnastics and the first Briton to win any individual gymnastics medal since Walter Tysall won men's all-around medal in 1908.
 Rowing
 China won its first ever Olympic rowing gold medal in the women's quadruple sculls.
 Sailing
 Ben Ainslie of Britain successfully defended his title, winning gold in the Finn class.
 Shooting
 Matthew Emmons finished fourth in the men's 50 m rifle three positions event having held the lead with one shot remaining: four years earlier he had fallen from first to eighth in the last shot of the event. China's Qiu Jian, who had entered the final in fourth position, shot the highest score in the final round to win the gold medal.
 Swimming
 The United States defeated Australia in the men's 4 × 100 m medley relay, setting a new world record of 3 minutes 29.34 seconds. Michael Phelps, swimming the third leg, won his eighth Olympic gold medal of the Beijing Games, surpassing Mark Spitz to become the athlete to win the most gold medals in a single Olympiad.
 Germany's Britta Steffen won the women's 50 m freestyle setting a new Olympic record of 24.06 seconds and beating American Dara Torres by just 0.01 seconds.
 Australia won the women's 4 × 100 m medley relay and set a new world record of 3:52.69, bettering the previous world record by 3.05 seconds. The United States won silver, also going under the previous world record and setting a new American record, while China won bronze with a new Asian record.
 Table Tennis
 China won the inaugural women's team event by winning all ten of its singles and all five of its doubles matches in the tournament.
 Tennis
 Rafael Nadal of Spain defeated Chile's Fernando González 6-3, 7-6 (7-2), 6-3 to win the men's singles, Spain's first ever Olympic gold medal in tennis. Gonzalez's medal was his third, making him Chile's most successful athlete at the Olympics.
 Wrestling
 Japan's Kaori Icho successfully defended her Olympic title in women's freestyle 63 kg.

Day 10: August 18
 Athletics
 Liu Xiang, China's defending Olympic champion in the men's 110 m hurdles, withdrew from the competition due to an injury.
Irving Saladino won Panama's first Olympic medal in 60 years, and their first gold medal ever in an Olympic athletics event.
 The United States took all three medals in the men's 400 m hurdles, with Angelo Taylor winning gold, Kerron Clement silver and Bershawn Jackson bronze.
 Russia's Yelena Isinbayeva set a new world record in winning the women's pole vault, the third time she had done so in 2008.
 Table Tennis
 Like the women, the Chinese men won the team competition without losing a match, winning all ten singles and all five doubles matches.
 Weightlifting
 Andrei Aramnau of Belarus broke three world records, for the snatch, clean and jerk, and total, on the way to winning the men's 105 kg event.

Day 11: August 19
 Athletics
 Great Britain won the women's 400 m for the first time through Christine Ohuruogu. Jamaica's Shericka Williams took silver and Sanya Richards of the United States took bronze.
 Lolo Jones of the United States clipped the second-last hurdle in the women's 100 m hurdles, finishing seventh; however, the US still took gold through Dawn Harper. Australia's Sally McLellan won the silver medal and Canada's Priscilla Lopes-Schliep was third.
 Rashid Ramzi wins the men's 1500 m, giving Bahrain its first ever Olympic gold medal.
 Cycling
 Chris Hoy won his third gold medal of the Beijing games in the men's sprint event, becoming the first British athlete in 100 years to win three gold medals in a single Olympiad.
  Victoria Pendelton added gold to the Great British track cycling medal total giving Great Britain victory in seven out of the ten track cycling titles. The team won 12 medals including 7 gold, 3 silver and 2 bronze to dominate the track events.
 Football
 Argentina defeated tournament favourite and longtime rival Brazil 3-0 in the semifinal of the men's football.

Day 12: August 20

 Athletics
 Usain Bolt won the men's 200 m in a new world record time of 19.30 seconds to become the first sprinter since Carl Lewis in 1984 to win both the 100 m and 200 m events in a single Olympiad, and the first sprinter since Don Quarrie in 1976 to hold the world records for both events simultaneously.
 In the men's 200 m, United States' Wallace Spearmon, who finished third in 19.85s, was disqualified for stepping out of his lane. Later, Netherlands Antilles' Churandy Martina, who finished second in 19.82s, was also disqualified for stepping out of his lane.
 Swimming
 After a race lasting nearly two hours, Russia's Larisa Ilchenko beat Keri-Anne Payne of Great Britain by 1.5 seconds to win the women's 10 km marathon. Payne and fellow British swimmer Cassandra Patten, who took bronze, had shared the lead for almost the entire race before being overtaken by Ilchenko with 50 metres remaining.
 Natalie du Toit of South Africa became the first amputee to compete in the Olympic Games since George Eyser in 1904, finishing 16th in the women's 10 km marathon.
 Sailing
 Yin Jian won China's first ever Olympic sailing gold medal in the women's sailboard.
 Taekwondo
 Rohullah Nikpai won Afghanistan's first Olympic medal ever by taking bronze in the men's 58 kg contest.
 Wu Jingyu from China defeated Thai athlete Buttree Puedpong in taekwondo women's 49 kg contest receiving a gold medal. Buttree became the first Thai athlete ever to win a silver medal for taekwondo and got the first silver medal for Thailand in 2008 Games.

Day 13: August 21

 Athletics
 Seven teams were eliminated in the men's and women's 4 × 100 m relay semifinals.
 Cuban sprinter Dayron Robles won the men's 110 m hurdles gold medal.
 Veronica Campbell-Brown won the women's 200 m, completing a Jamaican clean sweep of the sprint events.
 Softball
 Japan defeated the United States 3-1 in the final of the women's softball tournament.
 Volleyball
 American duo Kerri Walsh and Misty May-Treanor won the gold medal in the women's beach volleyball final, completing the tournament without dropping a single set and extending their unbeaten run in world competition to 108 matches.

Day 14: August 22
 Athletics
 Russia won the women's 4 × 100 m relay ahead of Belgium and Nigeria, but were disqualified on 16 August 2016 because a reanalysis of Yulia Chermoshanskaya’s samples resulted in a positive test for prohibited substances.
 The Jamaican men's team won the men's 4 × 100 m relay for the first time, setting a new world record time of 37.10 seconds. Usain Bolt, running the third leg, gained his third gold medal and third world record of the Beijing games, and became the first sprinter since 1984 to win the three sprint events in a single Olympiad.
 Tirunesh Dibaba of Ethiopia won her second gold medal of the Beijing games, claiming the women's 5000 m to go with her earlier victory in the 10000 m.
 Steven Hooker won Australia's first gold medal in men's athletics since 1968, in the men's pole vault.
 Maurren Higa Maggi won Brazil's first ever gold medal in any women's individual event, in the women's long jump.
 Cycling
 Anne-Caroline Chausson of France and Māris Štrombergs of Latvia took the inaugural gold medals in BMX, winning the women's and men's events respectively.
 Table tennis
 China won all three medals in the women's singles, with Zhang Yining defending her Olympic gold medal, Wang Nan taking silver, and Guo Yue bronze, leaving a competitor from Singapore in fourth place for the third consecutive Olympics.

Day 15: August 23
 Athletics
 Belgium's Tia Hellebaut won the women's high jump event, defeating the favourite and world champion Blanka Vlašić of Croatia and ending Vlasic's run of 38 wins in international competition.
 Sudan's Ismail Ahmed Ismail became his country's first Olympic medalist, taking silver in the men's 800 metres event.
 Baseball
 South Korea beat the favorite Cuba to win gold.
 Boxing
 Ukrainian Vasyl Lomachenko defeated Frenchman Khedafi Djelkhir in the first round of the gold medal fight in the featherweight category, the referee stopping the fight after less than two minutes after Djelkhir received his third standing count.
 Thai boxer Somjit Jongjohor won a gold medal in Flyweight boxing.
Middleweight boxer James DeGale won a gold medal in the middleweight class which, together with bronze medals for super heavyweight David Price and light heavyweight Tony Jeffries was the best result for Great Britain in boxing since 1956.
 Diving
 Australia's Matthew Mitcham won the men's 10 m platform gold medal with his final dive, preventing the Chinese team from winning every the diving event, and achieving the highest score for an individual dive in Olympic history.
 Rhythmic Gymnastics
 Almudena Cid of Spain retired after her fourth Olympic games finals, and was the only rhythmic gymnast to compete in more than two.
Evgenia Kanaeva of Russia finished first in every apparatus.
 Table tennis
 The Chinese men followed the achievement of the women by taking all three medals, with Ma Lin winning the gold, Wang Hao winning the silver for the second successive Olympics, and Wang Liqin taking the bronze medal in the men's singles. China became the first country to win all the medals for which they are eligible in table tennis: gold, silver and bronze in the men's and women's singles, and gold in the men's and women's team tournaments.
 Taekwondo
 South Korea won the gold medal in the men's 80 kg, with all four Korean athletes sent to Beijing taking gold.
 Ángel Matos of Cuba received a lifetime ban from taekwondo for assaulting the referee in the men's +80 kg event. Matos had been disqualified from his bronze medal bout for taking too long to return to the action after being injured.

Day 16: August 24
 General
 With the gold medal win by Zhang Xiaoping in the men's light heavyweight boxing, China won a total of 51 gold medals at this Olympic Games, the most for any NOC since the Soviet Union won 55 in 1988.

 Water polo
 Hungary won a third consecutive gold medal in men's water polo .

 Basketball
 The United States men's basketball team defeated world champions Spain 118–107 in the final.
 Boxing
 Zou Shiming won China's first Olympic boxing gold medal, in the light flyweight category.
 Bakhyt Sarsekbayev of Kazakhstan defeated Cuba's Carlos Banteaux Suarez to win the welterweight category, with the result that traditional boxing power Cuba finishes the Beijing games without any gold medals in boxing.
 Handball
 France won the 302nd and last gold medal of the Beijing Olympics, beating Iceland in the final of the men's handball.

 Closing ceremony
 The Closing Ceremony began at 8:00 pm China Standard Time (UTC+8). The number 8 is associated with prosperity and confidence in Chinese culture. The Closing Ceremony concluded at 9:55 pm CST.

See also
2008 Summer Olympics medal table
Chronological summary of the 2008 Summer Paralympics
Chronological summary of the 2010 Winter Olympics

References

External links
Official Website of the 2008 Summer Olympics
Official Website of the 2008 Summer Olympics - Schedules & Results
IOC Official 2008 Summer Olympics Website

2008 Summer Olympics
2008